The 2TE25K is a main line two-unit diesel-electric locomotive, rated at . It is equipped with AC/DC transmission and is designed to haul freight trains on the Russian Federation lines RZD on the broad gauge.

2TE25K diesel locomotive has been used as the basis of the 2TE25A class main line two-unit diesel freight locomotive of the same power rating and featuring AC/AC transmission and collector traction motors.

From 2017 to 2020, twelve triple-unit 3TE25K2M locomotives rated at  have been supplied. These are now the most powerful diesel locomotives on Russian railways.

See also
 The Museum of the Moscow Railway, at Paveletsky Rail Terminal, Moscow
 Rizhsky Rail Terminal, Home of the Moscow Railway Museum
 Varshavsky Rail Terminal, St.Petersburg, Home of the Central Museum of Railway Transport, Russian Federation
 History of rail transport in Russia

References

Co-Co+Co-Co locomotives
Diesel-electric locomotives of Russia
Luhanskteplovoz locomotives
5 ft gauge locomotives